Julio Peralta and Horacio Zeballos were the defending champions when the event was last held in 2015, but they chose not to defend their title.

Guido Andreozzi and Guillermo Durán won the title after defeating Nicolás Álvarez and Murkel Dellien 7–5, 6–2 in the final.

Seeds

Draw

References

External links
 Main draw

Corrientes Challenger - Doubles